Deadstick may refer to:

 Deadstick landing, when an aircraft loses all of its propulsive power and is forced to land
 Deadsticking, the act of presenting a soft plastic lure in fishing
 Operation Deadstick, an erroneous name used for the capture of the Caen canal and Orne river bridges during the Second World War's Normandy landings